Epicoccum is a genus of fungi belonging to the family Didymellaceae.

The genus has cosmopolitan distribution.

Species

Species:

Epicoccum agyrioides 
Epicoccum agyrium 
Epicoccum aleurophilum 
Epicoccum andropogonis
Epicoccum angulosum
Epicoccum aponogetonicum
Epicoccum asterinum
Epicoccum brasiliense
Epicoccum camelliae
Epicoccum chrysanthemi
Epicoccum coniferarum
Epicoccum davidssonii
Epicoccum deccanense
Epicoccum dendrobii
Epicoccum diversisporum
Epicoccum draconis
Epicoccum duchesneae
Epicoccum effusum
Epicoccum equiseti
Epicoccum eucalypti
Epicoccum fructigenum
Epicoccum granulatum
Epicoccum henningsii
Epicoccum hordei
Epicoccum huancayense
Epicoccum humicola
Epicoccum hyalopes
Epicoccum italicum
Epicoccum javanicum
Epicoccum latusicollum
Epicoccum layuense
Epicoccum ligustri
Epicoccum mackenziei
Epicoccum magnoliae
Epicoccum majus
Epicoccum maritimum
Epicoccum mezzettii
Epicoccum microscopicum
Epicoccum neglectum
Epicoccum nigrocinnabarinum
Epicoccum nigrum
Epicoccum nipponicum
Epicoccum oryzae
Epicoccum padi
Epicoccum pallescens
Epicoccum pandani
Epicoccum panici
Epicoccum phaseoli
Epicoccum pimprinum
Epicoccum plagiochilae
Epicoccum plurivorum
Epicoccum poaceicola
Epicoccum poae
Epicoccum polygonati
Epicoccum sibiricum
Epicoccum sinense
Epicoccum sorghinum
Epicoccum sphaerioides
Epicoccum thailandicum
Epicoccum torquens
Epicoccum tritici
Epicoccum viticis
Epicoccum yuccae
Epicoccum yunnanense

References

Pleosporales
Dothideomycetes genera